Massacre in Korea (French: Massacre en Corée) is an expressionistic painting completed on 18 January 1951 by Pablo Picasso. It is Picasso's third anti-war painting and depicts a scene of a massacre of a group of naked women and children by a firing squad. It has been considered to be a condemnation of American intervention in the Korean War. The painting was exhibited in the Musée Picasso in Paris.

Background
Massacre in Korea is the third in a series of anti-war paintings created by Picasso. It was preceded by the monumental Guernica, painted in 1937, and The Charnel House, painted from 1944 to 1945. The title of this painting refers to the outbreak of the Korean War, which had started in the previous year, yet the subject matter is ambiguous, as Picasso does not point directly to a period or location within the composition.

Picasso was exposed to the effects of war throughout his entire life and this had a direct impact on his artwork. From a young age, he began to include war motifs in his work. When the Spanish Civil War broke out, Picasso was deeply affected by it, which led to his painting of Guernica in 1937. Although Picasso did not take part in any war or serve as a soldier, he would use his artwork to make political statements. He claimed that his artwork was a "journal" that documented not only his personal life, but also the conflicts of his era. World War II marked a period of major upheaval and during this period, Picasso lived in occupied Paris. When France was liberated from the Nazis, he became committed to using his art for political statements. His post-war art therefore displays anti-war images and symbols of peace.

Description
The painting may depict an event similar to the No Gun Ri Massacre in July 1950, when an undetermined number of South Korean refugees were massacred by U.S. soldiers, or the Sinchon Massacre of the same year, a mass killing carried out in the county of Sinchon, South Hwanghae Province, North Korea. Massacre in Korea depicts civilians being killed by anti-communist forces. The art critic Kirsten Hoving Keen says that it is "inspired by reports of American atrocities" in Korea.

Picasso's work is influenced by Francisco Goya's painting The Third of May 1808, which shows Napoleon's soldiers executing Spanish civilians under the orders of Joachim Murat. It stands in the same iconographic tradition of an earlier work modeled after Goya: Édouard Manet's series of five paintings depicting the execution of Emperor Maximilian, completed between 1867 and 1869. 

As with Goya's The Third of May 1808, Picasso's painting is marked by a bifurcated composition, divided into two distinct parts. To the left, a group of naked women and children are seen situated at the foot of a mass grave. A number of heavily armed "knights" stand to the right, also naked, but equipped with "gigantic limbs and hard muscles similar to those of prehistoric giants." The firing squad is rigidly poised as in Goya. In Picasso's representation, however, the group is manifestly helter-skelter – as was often apparent in his portrayals of armored soldiers in drawings and lithographs – which may be taken to indicate an attitude of mockery of the idiocy of war. Their helmets are misshapen, and their weaponry is a mishmash amalgamation of the instruments of aggression from the medieval period to the modern era; not quite guns nor lances, they perhaps most resemble candlesticks. What is more, none of the soldiers have penises. This representational feature is highlighted by the pregnant state of the women on the left side of the panel. Many viewers have interpreted that the soldiers, in their capacity as destroyers of life, have substituted guns for their penises, thereby castrating themselves and depriving the world of the next generation of human life.  Along with Guernica and The Charnel House (1944–45), this is one of Picasso's works that he composed to depict the politics of his time.

Significance and legacy
Massacre in Korea is often overlooked and overshadowed in cultural consciousness by Guernica. It is more literal in its visual storytelling than the fragmented symbolism of the earlier, more famous work. When the painting was first viewed in 1951, it was not well received. Isabelle Limousin, exhibition curator, explained that the work was dismissed, as "too easy, too readable for contemporaries of the artist", yet she considers it to be "a very strong work".

Museu Picasso de Barcelona describes the painting as, "one of Picasso’s most important pacifist works in defense of human rights, beyond ideologies and sides."

Pierre Daix, an expert on Picasso opined that the painting has, "entered within the great tradition of paintings of cruelty, a 20th century version of the Massacre of the Innocents".

Attempted vandalism in Melbourne 
On 9 October 2022, two activists from the environmental pressure group Extinction Rebellion glued their hands to the painting using superglue while it was on loan to the National Gallery of Victoria in Melbourne. Their hands were attached to the perspex glazing protecting the painting but later removed without damage to the artwork. The activists were arrested but later released without charge.

See also
Dove, lithograph by Picasso (1949)
Anti-American sentiment in Korea
Bodo League massacre
List of massacres in North Korea
No Gun Ri massacre

References

1951 paintings
Nude art
Paintings about death
Paintings by Pablo Picasso
Paintings in the collection of the Musée Picasso
War paintings
Anti-war paintings
Works about the Korean War
Paintings of children